The Visitation is a 2006 American supernatural thriller/horror film directed by Robby Henson and starring Kelly Lynch, Edward Furlong, Priscilla Barnes and Martin Donovan. It was based on the 1999 novel The Visitation by Frank Peretti.

Plot 
Former minister Travis Jordan lives in Antioch, Washington, three years after losing his faith in God when his beloved wife was murdered and the criminals never found.

Suddenly, miracles happen in the little town: the new veterinarian’s son survives an accident whilst in a van without one single scratch, Travis’s dog Max revives after being buried, a paraplegic walks, and a scarred teenager and her police officer father (who has a brain tumor) heal.

In all these events, witnesses see either a group of three men wearing black nearby or their tall, (possibly) blond leader, who seems to want everyone to know that “he is coming”. Soon after, a scruffy, gentle-mannered newcomer named Brandon Nichols arrives. He implies through his healing work and preaching that he is Jesus Christ or the better version of the messiah.

The local population soon worships Brandon, while Travis and Morgan feel that something is wrong and conduct an investigation, disclosing that evil has possessed the town dwellers.

Cast

External links
 
  
 

2006 films
2006 horror films
2006 psychological thriller films
2000s supernatural thriller films
Films about evangelicalism
Films based on American novels
Films directed by Robby Henson
Films produced by Ralph Winter
Films set in Washington (state)
2000s supernatural horror films
Films produced by Kevin Downes
Resurrection in film
2000s English-language films